Anthony Buckley AO (born 27 July 1937) is an Australian film editor and producer.

Career

On leaving school, Buckley went to work for Cinesound Productions as a projectionist and assistant editor. He worked in Canada and Britain before returning to Australia in 1965. He went to work at Ajax Films and moved into producing.

He edited Michael Powell's Age of Consent.

In 1974 he produced the train film A Steam Train Passes. 24 years later he produced another two train films, Savannahlander and Gulflander. He produced the mini-series The Harp in the South and its sequel Poor Man's Orange.

Awards
1977 Order of Australia

Partial filmography

As editor
The Stowaway (1958) (assistant)
Age of Consent (1969)
Adam's Woman (1970)
Wake in Fright (1971)
Don Quixote (1973)

As producer
Forgotten Cinema (1967) – documentary
Snow, Sand and Savages
Caddie (1976)
A Steam Train Passes (1974)
The Night the Prowler (1978)
The Killing of Angel Street (1981)
Bliss (1985)
The Harp in the South (1986)
Poor Man's Orange (1987)
The Heroes (1989) – mini-series
 
More Winners – Mr Edmond (1990)
Heroes II: The Return (1991) – mini-series
Nazi Supergrass (1993)
Bedevil (1993)
The Celluloid Heroes (1995) - documentary series
Yum Cha Cha (2001)
Oyster Farmer (2004)
Savannahlander (2008)
Gulflander (2010)

References

External links
 
 Anthony Buckley's films at the National Film and Sound Archive

Australian film producers
Living people
1937 births